No Hats Beyond this Point is the sixth studio album by Canadian synthpop group Men Without Hats. Released in 2003, it was their first album in twelve years. After the release of the album, the group broke up. It was the group's third and final album to be produced by Stefan Doroschuk.

Style and availability
The album's music consisted almost entirely of synthesizers, reverting to the group's previous sound.

"How Does it Feel", the fourth track on the album, dates back to 2000, having been written for Ivan Doroschuk's putative second solo album. It is considered an "underground" album, a rarity that was not released to any record stores. In 2011, however, Stefan released the album commercially on several platforms for digital streaming and download.

All instruments were played by brothers Ivan and Stefan Doroschuk, with Ivan as lead singer.  Female background vocals were provided by Stefan's wife Mary-Lou Deehy, joined on one track by  Stefan's daughters Mary-Lynn and Emmy-Lou Doroschuk.

Critical reception
AllMusic's David Jeffries noted the return of the band's iconic graphic symbol and synthesizer sound, in a negative review that contrasted "the wry songwriting and catchy melodies of the early days" with unsatisfying "juvenile instrumental backing" and "insipid melodies" on the new album. The review criticized the album's social commentary as excessive, "simplistic and filled with clichés," and added, "It's hard not to cringe when main man Ivan Doroschuk delivers such sophomoric lyrics so sternly."

Track listing

Personnel 
 Ivan Doroschuk – vocals, guitar, synthesizer
 Stefan Doroschuk – vocals, guitar, violin
 Emmy-Lou Doroschuk, Mary-Lynn Doroschuk – backing vocals
 Mary-Lou Deehy – backing vocals

Notes

References

External links
 
 

Men Without Hats albums
2003 albums